Greece women's national under-19 football team represents Greece in international youth football competitions.

Results and fixtures

 The following is a list of match results in the last 12 months, as well as any future matches that have been scheduled.

Legend

Official results and fixtures

Players

Current Squad
 The following 24 players were called up for the friendly matches against  on 18 and 21 February 2023.

See Also
Greece women's national football team
Greece women's national under-17 football team

References

Greek football clubs 2022–23 season